Frances & Aiko was a Taiwanese pop music duo signed under Forward Music in 2009 as a part of the Hello! Project name under their overseas group, Hello! Project Taiwan. The members consisted of Frances Wu and Aiko Lan, two finalists of the Hello! Project New Star Audition.

History
In 2007, Japanese idol network Hello! Project held the Hello! Project New Star Audition to recruit members for a new girl group based in Taiwan in an attempt to expand towards the Chinese market, which would eventually lead towards the creation of Ice Creamusume. Frances and Aiko were finalists in the audition, and despite being too young to pass, Tsunku saw potential in them and put them in their own group, known as Big Small Sister. Unlike Ice Creamusume, Big Small Sister promoted primarily in Taiwan with Chinese-language songs, and there were no plans for them to promote in Japan.

Big Small Sister received dancing lessons in Japan and performed with Koharu Kusumi during a concert in February 2009.

In September 2009, Big Small Sister released their first mini album, I Am Big Small Sister. The mini album was received so favorably that a repackaged version, I Am Big Small Sister: Year of the Tiger version, was released in 2010.

In October 2009, Big Small Sister were invited as guests at the World Peace Day press conference in Taipei. This was followed by the release of their first album, Go For It! Big Small Sister. in 2011.

In 2012, Big Small Sister decided to disband to focus on school after agreement from their parents and management. After leaving Hello! Project, Big Small Sister released their final album, Follow Me, in 2013.

Discography

Studio albums

Extended plays

References

External links
 

Musical groups disestablished in 2013
Musical groups established in 2009
Hello! Project
Taiwanese girl groups